U.S. Route 25 (US 25) is a north–south United States highway that runs for  from the South Carolina state line, near Tuxedo, to the Tennessee state line, near Hot Springs.  It is part of the longer U.S. Route 25, which runs from Brunswick, Georgia to Covington, Ohio.  It is a major north-south route through Western North Carolina.

The route is mostly expressway or freeway grade, except for the section through the city of Asheville, where it follows several city streets.  Two short sections are co-signed with I-26, and the northernmost  are cosigned with US 70.  It originally followed the route of the historic Dixie Highway, though in several places it bypasses the original route on new alignments, several of which are now signed as either NC 225 or US 25 Business.

Route description
US 25 enters from South Carolina between Frank and Panther Mountains (part of the Saluda Mountains) and also changes from an expressway to freeway.  The first  of US 25 is solo, bypassing the smaller communities of Tuxedo, Zirconia, Flat Rock and East Flat Rock.  Its original alignment in the area is NC 225 and US 25 Bus. through Hendersonville, before it was signed along Corridor W, part of the Appalachian Development Highway System (ADHS).

At exit 9, US 25 merges with I-26/US 74 and goes northwesterly, crossing the Eastern Continental Divide (elevation ), at the Crest Road overpass (SR 1803).  In Hendersonville, it connects with US 64, which connect travelers to nearby Chimney Rock, Lake Lure and Brevard.

At I-26's exit 44, US 25 splits from I-26/US 74 and onto a four-lane road through Fletcher.  In Arden, US 25A begins, providing a  alternate route that avoids Skyland and Biltmore Forest; the intersection also begins the Asheville city limit, which encompasses everything between US 25 and US 25A.  Between Skyland and Biltmore Forest, the Blue Ridge Parkway crosses over US 25 with access roads along both north and southbound lanes. US 25 enters Asheville proper near I-40; passing underneath, it enters the Biltmore Village, where US 25A merges back and the Biltmore Estate is located.  Passing over the Swannanoa River, US 25 enters the downtown area along McDowell Street then onto Southside Avenue and Biltmore Avenue.  US 25 goes through the center of Asheville, which is marked by on Obelisk to Zebulon Baird Vance.  From the city center, it continues on Broadway Street to I-240, where it switches onto Merrimon Avenue.  At Beaver Lake, the road drops form four to two-lane for  before merging with Future I-26/US 19/US 23/US 70, in Woodfin; Merrimon Avenue continues on as Weaverville Road, signed as US 19 Bus.

US 25 has a short  concurrency with Future I-26/US 19/US 23, before continuing northwest, on a four-lane expressway with US 70, in Weaverville.  US 25/US 70 bypasses north of Marshall, with Business US 25/US 70 utilizing the original route through town.  Northwest of Marshall, US 25/US 70 drops from four to two-lane, which it will remain for the rest of its routing through North Carolina.  Entering the Pisgah National Forest near Walnut, US 25/US 70 go westerly, crossing the French Broad River in Hot Springs, then crossing through the Bald Mountains into Tennessee.

Scenic byways
US 25 is part of two scenic byways in the state (indicated by a Scenic Byways sign).

French Broad Overview is an  byway from Weaverville to Marshall; it is known for its scenic views along the French Broad River.  The byway begins at the Monticello Road intersection in Weaverville, where it connects with NC 251 along the banks of the French Broad River; it continues north, switching to US 25/70 Business into Marshall and it back along US 25/70.

Appalachian Medley is a  byway from near Lake Junaluska to Walnut; it is known for several recreational areas, the Appalachian Trail, and its scenic mountain drive.

History

Established as an original U.S. Route (1926), US 25 was assigned along the Dixie Highway, which followed NC 29 from South Carolina, through Tuxedo, Flat Rock, Hendersonville, and Biltmore Forest, to Asheville.  In the downtown area, US 25 links-up with US 70/NC 20 on College Street; it then proceeds north along Merrimon Avenue out of the city.  Following Old Marshall Highway to Marshall, it continues along the same route as today into Tennessee.  In 1929, NC 29 was replaced by an extension of NC 69; in 1934, both NC 20 and NC 69 were dropped from the route.

Around 1933, US 25 was rerouted along McDowell Street from Biltmore Avenue.  During the mid-1950s, US 25 was split onto one-way streets in Hendersonville (northbound King Street/southbound Main Street); by the early 1960s, southbound traffic moved onto College Street, replacing US 25 Alternate (originally established sometime in 1939-1944 as a bypass through the main roads of town).

In 1960, a bypass north around Marshall was completed, old route through town became US 25 Business (along with US 70).  Around 1969, the community of Walnut was bypassed.  In 1981, US 25 was moved onto the existing US 19/US 23 freeway north of Asheville, it then went on to new four-lane road west of Weaverville; the most of the old route was replaced by NC 251.

In 1974, US 25 was placed onto new expressway between Zirconia to the South Carolina state line, the old route would later become part of NC 225 in 1997.  In September, 2003, US 25 was rerouted onto I-26/US 74, bypassing Flat Rock and Hendersonville, then replacing part of NC 225 that bridged the connection from the interstate to Zirconia.  The old route was replaced by NC 225 through Flat Rock and US 25 Business through Hendersonville via US 176.

Junction list

See also

 Special routes of U.S. Route 25

References

External links

NCRoads.com: U.S. 25

 North Carolina
25
Transportation in Henderson County, North Carolina
Transportation in Buncombe County, North Carolina
Transportation in Madison County, North Carolina